Johannes Müller, Johann Müller or Hans Müller is the name of:

 Johannes Müller von Königsberg (1436–1476), known as Regiomontanus, German mathematician and astronomer
 Johannes von Müller (1752–1809), Swiss historian
 Johannes Peter Müller (1801–1858), German physiologist, comparative anatomist, ichthyologist, and herpetologist
 Johannes Müller Argoviensis (1828–1896), Swiss botanist
 Johannes Müller (theologian) (1864–1949)
 Johannes Müller (Marburg) (1880–1964), German politician and mayor of Marburg
Johannes Müller (archaeologist)  (born 1960), German archaeologist

See also 
 Johan Müller (disambiguation)
 Johann Müller (disambiguation)
 Hans Müller (disambiguation)
 Müller (surname)